This article summarizes the events related to the world of poker in 1982.

Major Tournaments

1982 World Series of Poker 

Main tournament exceeds 100 players for the first time. Jack Straus wins the main tournament.

1982 Super Bowl of Poker 

Ed Stevens wins the main tournament.

Poker Hall of Fame 

Tom Abdo is inducted.

See also 

 Chronology of poker

References 

1982 in poker